César García Calvo (born 24 December 1974 in Ponferrada) is a Spanish former cyclist.

Major results
1996
 2nd Overall Vuelta a la Comunidad de Madrid
 3rd Overall Cinturón a Mallorca
1998
 1st Stage 1 Cinturón a Mallorca
2000
1st Circuito de Getxo
2001
 1st  Sprints classification Vuelta a España
2002
 1st Stage 2 Tour of the Basque Country

References

External links

1974 births
Living people
Spanish male cyclists
People from Ponferrada
Sportspeople from the Province of León